Gyangkar or Jiangga is a town in Dinggyê County, in the Shigatse prefecture-level city of the Tibet Autonomous Region of China. At the time of the 2010 census, the town had a population of 4,428., it had 6 communities under its administration.

References 

Township-level divisions of Tibet
Populated places in Shigatse